Amanchi Krishna Mohan was ex Member of the Legislative Assembly (MLA) of Chirala Constituency, Andhra Pradesh.

Personal life
Amanchi Krishna Mohan was born on 1975 in the Pandillapalli Village of the Praksam, Andhra Pradesh. He received his graduation as a B.Sc. from ASN College, Tenali.

Political life
He started his political career as an Indian National Congress Member and was elected as the ZPTC member in 2000 from  Vetapalem Mandal and in 2009 he was elected as MLA for Chirala Constituency and in the 2014 elections won as an independent member for Chirala, then after the elections he merged his party with Telugu Desam party.

He quit Telugu Desam Party in February 2019 and joined YSR Congress Party.

References

Living people
Indian National Congress politicians from Andhra Pradesh
People from Prakasam district
1975 births